Dance Bash is a studio album by Charlie Barnet and his Orchestra released on Verve Records LP record MGV-2007 in 1956.

Recording
The album was recorded in several sessions between the years 1947 and 1952, in sessions produced by Norman Granz.  The album's lead track, "Jubilee Jump" was recorded in New York City on August 25, 1947 in a session for Apollo Records.  Four songs were recorded by Barnet for this date, three of which originally appeared as 78rpm singles.  Only this one track from the session makes it onto this album.  It was originally released as Apollo 1092.  Although recorded for Apollo, the rights for this and all subsequent Barnet sessions done for Apollo were retained by Granz, allowing its appearance here.  Before appearing on this LP, it also was released as a single on Granz's Clef Records as catalog #8982.  "Charleston Alley" is from November 30, 1947.  This recording made its debut on Clef single #8981.  From the same session come "Gal from Joe's" (originally Clef 8979) and "Southern Fried" (Clef 8982.)  The standard "Deep Purple" again originally appeared on Apollo (as #1092), from a September 2, 1947 5-song session where three of the tracks were for Apollo, and the remaining 2 were for the V-Disc program.  "Blue Lou" is the earliest recording on the album.  It is from the earliest session that appears on this album, taking place on February 3, 1947.  This session consisted of four songs, each of which appeared on Apollo as 78rpm singles.  "Charleston Alley" was recorded "Blue Lou" was originally released as Apollo 1082.  Rounding out side 1 were Barnet's two biggest his:  Cherokee and Skyliner.  These two songs were recorded March 5, 1951 in Los Angeles.  They originally appeared on Clef 8981 and 8979, respectively.  All of these songs appearing on side 1 were first issued on Clef LP MCG114.  Side 2 consists of tracks recorded on July 9 and 10.  All of these were originally issued in the Clef 89000 single series, except for "St. Louis Blues" which is original to this album and has not otherwise been issued.

Reception
Although most of these tracks have not been officially issued in digital format, Scott Yanow has stated the album is "excellent" and therefore "worth searching for."

Track listing

Personnel
 Bob Bain - guitar
 Charlie Barnet - soprano, alto, tenor saxophones
 Walt Benson - trombone
 Kurt Bloom - tenor sax
 Frank Bradley - trombone
 James Campbell - trumpet
 Porky Cohen - trombone
 Don Davidson - baritone sax
 Bob Dawes - baritone sax
 Joe Graves - trumpet
 Jack Henderson - tenor sax
 Burt Johnson - trombone
 Hank Jones - piano
 Dick Kenney - trombone
 Al Killian - trumpet
 Don Lamond - drums
 Irving Lewis - trumpet
 Mundell Lowe - guitar
 Everett McDonald - trumpet
 Guy McReynolds - alto sax
 Obie Massingill - trombone
 Bill Miller - piano
 Dave Nichols - trumpet
 Wayne Nichols - trumpet
 Ray Norman - tenor sax
 Jimmy Nottingham - trumpet
 Dick Paladino - alto sax
 Frank Papalardo - alto sax
 Tommy Pederson - trombone
 Bob Peterson - bass
 Al Porcino - trumpet
 Don Raffael - tenor sax
 Art Robey - trumpet
 Shorty Rogers - trumpet
 Stan Seckler - alto sax
 Doc Severinsen - trumpet
 Dick Shanahan - drums
 Charlie Shavers - trumpet
 Dick Sherman - trumpet
 Frank Sivaro - bass
 John Soltaine - trombone
 Clark Terry - trumpet
 Phil Washburne - trombone
 Walt Weidler - alto sax
 Fred Zito - trombone

References

1956 albums
Verve Records albums
Instrumental albums